Siv Heim Sæbøe (born 25 March 1973) is a Norwegian team handball player who played for the club Bækkelagets SK and on the Norway women's national handball team. She became European champion in 1998.

Sæbøe made her debut on the national team in 1998, and her position was pivot/line player.

References

External links

1973 births
Living people
Norwegian female handball players